General elections were held in Palau on 2 November 1988 to elect a President, Vice-President, Senate and House of Delegates. All candidates ran as independents. Ngiratkel Etpison was elected President, whilst Kuniwo Nakamura won the election for Vice-President. Voter turnout was 82.6%.

Results

President

Vice-President

Senate

House of Delegates

References

Palau
1988 in Palau
Elections in Palau
Non-partisan elections
Presidential elections in Palau